Gask Hill is one of the least climbed hills of the Sidlaw range in south east Perthshire, Scotland. Gask Hill is located near Coupar Angus and is seen easily from the roadside. It lies between Northballo Hill to the northeast and its parent peak King's Seat to the southwest.

References

Mountains and hills of Perth and Kinross